VeriStrat is a test developed to evaluate patient prognosis and, additionally, predict benefit from cancer treatment by EGFR inhibitors. It is a serum/plasma proteomic test developed using matrix-assisted laser desorption/ionization (MALDI) mass spectrometry. 
VeriStrat was developed by Biodesix, Inc., a molecular diagnostics company based in Boulder, Colorado, US.

The VeriStrat algorithm has been interrogated retrospectively and prospectively in samples from randomized trials, such as the PROSE study, confirming the prognostic information associated with the molecular signature. In addition, the test appeared to be predictive of erlotinib impact on survival, as only "VeriStrat Good patients" benefited from such a treatment. Additional studies have confirmed its clinical relevance.

References

 Original article describing the test: http://jnci.oxfordjournals.org/content/99/11/838.full.pdf+html
Lung Cancer Journal, “Outcome and economic implications of proteomic test-guided second- or third-line treatment for advanced non-small cell lung cancer: Extended analysis of the PROSE trial”, Hornberger et al.
"Predictive value of a proteomic signature in patients with non-small cell lung cancer treated with second-line erlotinib or chemotherapy (PROSE): a biomarker stratified, randomised phase 3 trial," Gregorc et al. The Lancet Oncology
A Retrospective Analysis of VeriStrat Status on Outcome of a Randomized Phase II Trial of First-Line Therapy with Gemcitabine, Erlotinib, or the Combination in Elderly Patients (Age 70 Years or Older) with Stage IIIB/IV Non-Small-Cell Lung Cancer. Stinchcombe, et al. Journal of Thoracic Oncology.

Medical tests
Targeted therapy